The 1898–1899 Penn State Nittany Lions basketball team represented Penn State University during the 1898–99 college men's basketball season. The team finished with a final record of 2–3.

Schedule

|-

References

Penn State Nittany Lions basketball seasons
Penn State Nittany Lions Basketball Team
Penn State
Penn State Nittany L